Zünheboto (Pron:/ˌzʌnˈhiːbəʊtəʊ/), also known as Zünhebo, is a town located in the Indian state of Nagaland. Zünheboto is inhabited by the Sümi Nagas. It is the location of the largest Baptist church in Asia, the Zünheboto Sümi Baptist Church.

Etymology
The word Zünheboto is derived from the Sümi words zünhebo, the name of a flowering shrub Leucosceptrum, and to or ato, hill top. The zünhebo plant grows abundantly in this region and the town was built on the top of the rolling hills hence the name, Zünhebo-to or Zünheboto.
Hence, Zünheboto means the hill top of Zünhebo flowers.

Geography
Zünheboto lies north of the Satoi Range. Due to its elevation, Zünheboto features a more moderate version of a humid subtropical climate (Cwa. Zünheboto has cool winters and hot very rainy summers. The coldest months are from December to February, when frost occurs and in the higher altitudes snowfall occurs occasionally. Heavy rainfall occurs during summer.

Demographics
, Zünheboto town had a population of 22,633. Males constitute 51.7% of the population and females 48.23%.

Educational Institutions

Schools in Zünheboto Town
 Bloomfield Hill School
 Corner Stone Foundation School
 Eden Garden School
 Government Higher Secondary School
 Immanuel Higher Secondary School
 Kids World Montessori
 Little Spring School
 Love Dale Higher Secondary School
 Merry Hill School
 New Era School
 Olympic Higher Secondary School
 Sacred Heart School
 Seven Home School
 Shamrock School
 St. Anthony School
 Step By Step School
 Sunbeam School
 Woodland Higher Secondary School

Colleges
 Zünheboto Government College
 Nito Theological College
 Anderson Theological College

See also
 Sümi Naga
 Aghunato
 Satakha
 Akuluto

References

 
Cities and towns in Zünheboto district